William O'Malley may refer to:

William O'Malley (Jesuit) (born 1931), American Jesuit priest, author, and actor
William O'Malley (politician) (1853–1939), Irish Member of Parliament representing Galway Connemara